The colony stimulating factor 1 (CSF1), also known as macrophage colony-stimulating factor (M-CSF), is a secreted cytokine which causes hematopoietic stem cells to differentiate into macrophages or other related cell types. Eukaryotic cells also produce M-CSF in order to combat intercellular viral infection. It is one of the three experimentally described colony-stimulating factors. M-CSF binds to the colony stimulating factor 1 receptor. It may also be involved in development of the placenta.

Structure 
M-CSF is a cytokine, being a smaller protein involved in cell signaling. The active form of the protein is found extracellularly as a disulfide-linked homodimer, and is thought to be produced by proteolytic cleavage of membrane-bound precursors.

Four transcript variants encoding three different isoforms (a proteoglycan, glycoprotein and cell surface protein) have been found for this gene.

Function 

M-CSF (or CSF-1) is a hematopoietic growth factor that is involved in the proliferation, differentiation, and survival of monocytes, macrophages, and bone marrow progenitor cells. M-CSF affects macrophages and monocytes in several ways, including stimulating increased phagocytic and chemotactic activity, and increased tumour cell cytotoxicity.
The role of M-CSF is not only restricted to the monocyte/macrophage cell lineage. By interacting with its membrane receptor (CSF1R or M-CSF-R encoded by the c-fms proto-oncogene), M-CSF also modulates the proliferation of earlier hematopoietic progenitors and influence numerous physiological processes involved in immunology, metabolism, fertility and pregnancy.

M-CSF released by osteoblasts (as a result of endocrine stimulation by parathyroid hormone) exerts paracrine effects on osteoclasts.  M-CSF binds to receptors on osteoclasts inducing differentiation, and ultimately leading to increased plasma calcium levels—through the resorption (breakdown) of bone. Additionally, high levels of CSF-1 expression are observed in the endometrial epithelium of the pregnant uterus as well as high levels of its receptor CSF1R in the placental trophoblast.  Studies have shown that activation of trophoblastic CSF1R by local high levels of CSF-1 is essential for normal embryonic implantation and placental development. More recently, it was discovered that CSF-1 and its receptor CSF1R are implicated in the mammary gland during normal development and neoplastic growth.

Clinical significance 

Locally produced M-CSF in the vessel wall contributes to the development and progression of atherosclerosis.

M-CSF has been described to play a role in renal pathology including acute kidney injury and chronic kidney failure. The chronic activation of monocytes can lead to multiple metabolic, hematologic and immunologic abnormalities in patients with chronic kidney failure. In the context of acute kidney injury, M-CSF has been implicated in promoting repair following injury, but also been described in an opposing role, driving proliferation of a pro-inflammatory macrophage phenotype.

As a drug target
PD-0360324 and MCS110 are CSF1 inhibitors in clinical trials for some cancers. See also CSF1R inhibitors.

Interactions 

Macrophage colony-stimulating factor has been shown to interact with PIK3R2.

References

Further reading

External links 
 
 

Cytokines
Glycoproteins
Proteoglycans